State Route 110 (SR 110) is a Tennessee state highway in Limestone County, Alabama and Giles and Lincoln counties in Tennessee.

It connects Ardmore, Tennessee/Ardmore, Alabama with Fayetteville, Tennessee.

Route description
SR 110 begins in Ardmore, Tennessee/Alabama at the Tennessee-Alabama state line at an intersection with TN SR 7 and AL SR 53. It then travels northeastward and leaves Ardmore and goes through rural southern Middle Tennessee. It continues a northeastward trek, where it passes through Blanche, until just before its junction with SR 274 at Taft, then turns southeastward and then back northeastward to pass through Kirkland. It ends at an intersection with US 231/US 431 (SR 10) in Fayetteville city limits just south downtown.

Junction list

References

Transportation in Limestone County, Alabama
Transportation in Giles County, Tennessee
Transportation in Lincoln County, Tennessee
110